2013 ET is a near-Earth asteroid that was first observed on March 3, 2013, six days before its closest approach to Earth. The orbit of  has been connected to 2013 ET extending the observation arc to 11 years.

The asteroid also makes close approaches to Mars and Venus. The asteroid was imaged by Goldstone radar on March 10, 2013.

2013 ET was one of four asteroids that passed in the vicinity of Earth during one week in early March 2013.

See also 
List of asteroid close approaches to Earth in 2013
 2013 EC
 2013 PJ10
 List of asteroid close approaches to Earth
 List of Near-Earth asteroids by distance from Sun
 Near-Earth Asteroid Tracking

References

External links 
 

Minor planet object articles (unnumbered)

20130303